Everard Ter Laak (November 5, 1868 - May 5, 1931) was a Dutch Roman Catholic missionary and bishop who worked in China during the late Qing dynasty and early Republic of China.

Biography
Everard Ter Laak was born on November 5, 1868 in Didam, Montferland, Netherlands, the son of the Miller Jacobus Everardus Ter Laak (1824–1888) and his wife Maria Bernardina van der Grinten (1832–1886).

On November 17, 1889, he entered the Congregation of the Immaculate Heart of Mary. On April 3, 1892, he was ordained a priest within the Congregation and went on mission to the Qing Empire.

On June 21, 1906, Pope Pius X appointed him Apostolic Vicar of the Southern Kansu. In 1914 he was appointed titular bishop of Paroecopolis. The episcopal consecration Jerome van Aertselaer donated him. Co-consecrators were Alphonse Bermyn and Conrad Abels. At the same time he was appointed Apostolic Coadjutor Vicar of Central Mongolia. In 1922, the Apostolic Vicariate of Central Mongolia was renamed the Apostolic Vicariate of Chahar. In 1924 he was appointed as the successor of Jeroom Van Aertselaer, which was renamed in the same year the Apostolic Vicariate of Xiwanzi. At the same time he was Superior of Urga in Mongolia.

In addition, from 1924 until the death of Bishop Everard Ter Laak, he was the Apostolic Administrator of the mission of sui iuris Urgi in Mongolia.

Everard Ter Laak died on 5 May 1931 at the age of 62.

References

External links
 
 GCatholic
 
 

1868 births
1931 deaths
People from Montferland
20th-century Roman Catholic bishops in China
Dutch emigrants to China